Route 349 begins as a freeway spur from I-95 (at Exit 87) leading to the city of Groton. It has full interchanges with I-95 and US 1.

Route description
Route 349 begins at Shennecossett Road in Groton. It travels west of the Shennocossett Golf Course as it runs parallel to the Thames River. It proceeds north known as Eastern Point Road. Route 349 becomes a 4-lane road before turning east. The road continues west then south as a surface road through the Groton Heights neighborhood. It intersects US 1 before reaching an interchange with I-95 where it meets its end.

The surface road section of Route 349 from mile post 0.89 to the junction with SR 649 is also known as the "City Police Officer William J. Snyder, Sr. Memorial Highway".

History
In the 1960s, Groton was a center of submarine manufacturing. An unsigned state highway, State Road 649, led from I-95's exit 85 to the industrial area. The many urban intersections through Groton center led to elevated traffic congestion. Because of this, a proposal to relocate SR 649 onto a new expressway arose. The expressway was completed in 1966, and SR 649 was relocated onto it. In 1985, part of SR 649 was re-designated as Route 349, and additionally included a portion of a road leading to Avery Point, resulting in the modern alignment and designation.

Junction list
Exit numbers on the freeway portion of Route 349 are mile-based.

References

External links

349
Transportation in New London County, Connecticut